Ruby Neilam Salvador Adams (born July 10, 1932), known professionally as Neile Adams, is a Filipino American actress, singer, and dancer who made more than 20 appearances in films and television series between 1952 and 1991.

Early life and family
Adams was born in Manila in 1932, daughter of José Arrastia, the maternal great-grandfather of Enrique Iglesias. She reportedly never met her father. Her mother, Carmen "Miami" Salvador, was a hula dancer of Spanish and German descent. In her early teens, during the Japanese army's occupation of Manila during World War II, Adams became a spy for the Philippine resistance, carrying messages between guerrilla groups. She was later wounded by shrapnel during the Allied liberation of the island. She moved to the United States in 1948 and attended Rosemary Hall, a private school in Connecticut. She then went to New York to study dancing where she got a scholarship at the Katherine Dunham School of Dance. To avoid typecasting because of her name, she became known as Neile Adams.

Career

In 1958, producer George Abbott offered Adams a role in the Broadway production of Damn Yankees. She was unable to accept because the Versailles Club would not release her from her contract as a dancer. Her Broadway credits include performing in Kismet and The Pajama Game. She also performed in Broadway Bound at The Grand opposite Paul Muni. She married then-struggling actor Steve McQueen four months after their meeting in 1956 while filming MGM’s This Could Be the Night (1957) where she was under contract. Adams opened the Tropicana Hotel in Las Vegas in 1958 with Dick Shawn and Vivian Blaine.

Her other screen credits include Women in Chains (1972), Fuzz (1972), So Long, Blue Boy (1973), Chu Chu and the Philly Flash (1981), and Buddy Buddy (1981). Her television credits include: The Perry Como Show, two Bob Hope Christmas specials, The Eddie Fisher Show, The Patrice Munsel Show, The Pat Boone Show and The Hollywood Palace. Her dramatic television roles include a 1960 episode of Alfred Hitchcock Presents, titled "Man from the South", opposite McQueen and Peter Lorre. Two more Alfred Hitchcock episodes followed: a half-hour show directed by Arthur Hiller in which she starred, "One Grave Too Many", and an Alfred Hitchcock Hour episode entitled "Ten Minutes From Now". She also appeared on episodes of such television series as Man From U.N.C.L.E., The Rockford Files, The Bionic Woman, Fantasy Island, and Vega$.

Personal life

Adams met and married American film and television actor Steve McQueen in 1956. The couple had two children together: a daughter, Terry Leslie McQueen (1959–1998), and a son, Chad McQueen, born in 1960. The marriage ended in divorce in 1972. She is the grandmother of actor Steven R. McQueen. She later married Alvin Toffel, a political campaign manager and president of the Norton Simon Museum; they were married until Toffel's death in 2005.

Archive

The Academy Film Archive houses the Steve McQueen-Neile Adams Collection, which consists of personal prints and home movies.

References

Further reading

External links

Living people
1932 births
Actresses from Manila
American film actresses
American stage actresses
American television actresses
American actresses of Filipino descent
People with acquired American citizenship
Filipino emigrants to the United States
Racing drivers' wives and girlfriends
21st-century American women